Ellen Ratner (born in Cleveland, Ohio) is an American news analyst who formerly appeared on the Fox News Channel and appeared on The Strategy Room and The Long and Short of It. She is a retired White House correspondent and former bureau chief for Talk Media News, which she also managed, covering the White House and was heard on more than 400 radio stations across the US. Her brothers are New York City-based developer Bruce Ratner and the late human rights attorney Michael Ratner.

She is the author of Ready, Set, Talk! A Guide to Getting Your Message Heard by Millions on Talk Radio, Talk Television, and Talk Internet (2006), 101 Ways to Get Your Progressive Ideas on Talk Radio (1997), and The Other Side of the Family: A Book for Recovery from Abuse, Incest and Neglect (1990). In 2011 she co-authored, Self Empowerment: Nine Things the 19th Century Can Teach Us About Living in the 21st.

She is also co-founder of self-help publishing company Changing Lives Press. Among other books it has come out with is a satire of her brother's Atlantic Yards saga. It also came out with her 2011 book.

Ratner attended Goddard College and, for a Masters in Education, Harvard University. She is married to Cleveland resident Cholene Espinoza. She has two brothers: New York attorney Michael Ratner and real estate developer Bruce Ratner.

She also appeared in an Episode of Frasier in 2004 (season 11), "Match Game".

References

External links

Living people
Jewish American journalists
American people of Polish-Jewish descent
American radio personalities
American television journalists
Fox News people
Harvard Graduate School of Education alumni
Television personalities from Cleveland
American lesbian writers
American LGBT journalists
American LGBT broadcasters
Place of birth missing (living people)
LGBT people from Ohio
American women television journalists
Year of birth missing (living people)
Ratner family
21st-century American Jews
21st-century American women writers